Eulimella simplex is a species of sea snail, a marine gastropod mollusk in the family Pyramidellidae, the pyrams and their allies.

Description
The white shell is thin. Its length measures 2.3 mm. Its sculpture shows finely spiral striae. The seven whorls of the teleoconch are slightly convex, with a shallow channel next above the suture.

Distribution
This species occurs in the Caribbean Sea off Jamaica.

References

External links
 To Biodiversity Heritage Library (2 publications)
 To Encyclopedia of Life
 To World Register of Marine Species

simplex
Gastropods described in 1841